This is a list of the players who were on the rosters of the given teams who participated in the 2008 Beijing Olympics for women's water polo. The women's tournament included eight teams, with a maximum of thirteen players per team.

Pool A

The following is the Chinese roster in the women's water polo tournament of the 2008 Summer Olympics.

Head coach: Juan Jane Giralt

The following is the Italian roster in the women's water polo tournament of the 2008 Summer Olympics.

Head coach: Mauro Maugeri

The following is the Russian roster in the women's water polo tournament of the 2008 Summer Olympics.

Head coach: Alexander Kleymenov

The following is the American roster in the women's water polo tournament of the 2008 Summer Olympics.

Head coach: Guy Baker

Group B

The following is the Australian roster in the women's water polo tournament of the 2008 Summer Olympics.

Head coach: Greg McFadden

The following is the Greek roster in the women's water polo tournament of the 2008 Summer Olympics.

Head coach: Kyriakos Iosifidis

The following is the Hungarian roster in the women's water polo tournament of the 2008 Summer Olympics.

Head coach: Gabor Godova

The following is the Dutch roster in the women's water polo tournament of the 2008 Summer Olympics.

Head coach: Robin van Galen

See also
Water polo at the 2008 Summer Olympics – Men's team rosters

References

Women's team rosters
2008 Summer Olympics
2008 in women's water polo